Munyonyo is an area on the northern shores of Lake Victoria and part of the metropolitan area of Kampala, in Makindye Division.

Location
Munyonyo is bordered by Lake Victoria to the south, Bulingugwe Island to the southeast, Ggaba to the east, Salaama to the northeast, Buziga to the north, Makindye to the northwest, and Lubowa to the west. The coordinates of Munyonyo are 0°14'32.0"N 32°37'29.0"E (Latitude:0.242225; Longitude:32.624725).

Overview

Munyonyo is one of the most upscale residential neighborhoods in the city of Kampala. It is the location of two of Kampala's resorts: the Speke Resort and Conference Center and the Commonwealth Resort. The latter was the venue of the 2007 Commonwealth Heads of Government Meeting, also known as the Commonwealth Heads of Government Meeting 2007.

Munyonyo is also a martyrdom spot of the Uganda Martyrs. Catholic saints Andrew Kaggwa and Denis Ssebuggwawo Wasswa and Anglican Mukasa Musa were murdered on 25 and 26 May 1886 by King Mwanga II of Buganda. Other martyrs were imprisoned in Munyonyo and taken for execution in Namugongo. On the same day in Munyonyo, four catechumens: Kizito, Gyaviira Musoke, Mbaga Tuzinde, and Mugagga Lubowa were secretly baptized by Charles Lwanga, at that time the leader of Uganda's Christian community.

Landmarks

Landmarks in or near Munyonyo include:

 Munyonyo Martyrs Shrine, a catholic basilica with the execution spot of Saint Denis Ssebuggwawo Wasswa and the tomb of Saint Andrew Kaggwa
 public health clinic administered by the Kampala Capital City Authority

See also
 Ggaba
 National Water and Sewerage Corporation
 Entebbe-Kampala Highway

References

External links
Munyonyo Martyrs' Shrine

Neighborhoods of Kampala
Cities in the Great Rift Valley
Populated places on Lake Victoria
Makindye Division